Rosenstock is a surname of German origin (Rosenstock meaning rosebush in German). Notable people with the surname include:

 Gregory Rosenstock (born 1951), Irish writer
 Oliver Rosenstock (born 1989), Tv reality star
 Eugen Rosenstock-Huessy (1888–1973), German social philosopher
 Fred Rosenstock (1895–1986), Austrian-born American book and art collector
 Gabriel Rosenstock (born 1949), Irish poet
 Jeff Rosenstock (born 1982), American musician
 Józef Rosenstock (1895–1985), Polish conductor
 Larry Rosenstock, American civil servant and schoolteacher
 Linda Rosenstock (born 1950), Public health administrator
 Mario Rosenstock (born 1971), Irish actor and musician
 Milton Rosenstock (1917–1992), American conductor and composer
 Odette Abadi (née Rosenstock; 24 August 1914 – 29 July 1999) French physician, and member of the Resistance

See also
 Rosenstock Village Site, a historic site located in Frederick County, Maryland

German-language surnames
Jewish surnames
Yiddish-language surnames